Benedetto Junck (21/25 August 1852 – 3 October 1903) was an Italian composer, the son of an Italian woman and an Alsatian father.  Born in Turin, he was trained there for a career in business, and began work in that line in Paris before turning to music.  He studied with Alberto Mazzucato and Antonio Bazzini.  Much of his output was chamber music; he also composed a few songs and romanze.

External links

References
A Dictionary of Music and Musicians from Google Books
Benedetto Junck at Classical-composers.org

1852 births
1903 deaths
Italian composers
Italian male composers
Musicians from Turin
19th-century Italian musicians
19th-century Italian male musicians